The 1991 World Table Tennis Championships mixed doubles was the 41st edition of the mixed doubles championship. 

Wang Tao and Liu Wei defeated Xie Chaojie and Chen Zihe in the final by three sets to nil.

Results

See also
List of World Table Tennis Championships medalists

References

-